Mario Alfredo Sciacqua (born 30 August 1970) is an Argentine football manager and former player who played as a right winger.

Sciacqua has also managed Colón, Gimnasia Jujuy, Olimpo, Quilmes and Patronato in Argentina, as well as San Luis in Chile.

References

External links

1970 births
Living people
Argentine footballers
Association football wingers
Club Atlético Colón footballers
Arsenal de Sarandí footballers
Deportivo Municipal footballers
FBC Melgar footballers
Argentine expatriate footballers
Argentine expatriate sportspeople in Peru
Expatriate footballers in Peru
Argentine football managers
Argentine Primera División managers
Primera B Nacional managers
Club Atlético Colón managers
Gimnasia y Esgrima de Jujuy managers
Olimpo managers
Club Atlético Patronato managers
Godoy Cruz Antonio Tomba managers
Club Atlético Sarmiento managers
San Luis de Quillota managers
Argentine expatriate football managers
Argentine expatriate sportspeople in Chile
Expatriate football managers in Chile